Alyn and Deeside may refer to:
 Alyn and Deeside (UK Parliament constituency)
 Alyn and Deeside (Senedd constituency)
 Alyn and Deeside (district), the former local government district in what is now Flintshire